
Year 1567 (MDLXVII) was a common year starting on Wednesday (link will display the full calendar) of the Julian calendar.

Events

January–June 
 January – A Spanish force under the command of Captain Juan Pardo establishes Fort San Juan, in the Native American settlement of Joara. The fort is the first European settlement in present-day North Carolina.
 January 20 – Battle of Rio de Janeiro: Portuguese forces under the command of Estácio de Sá definitively drive the French out of Rio de Janeiro.
 January 23 – After 45 years' reign, the Jiajing Emperor dies in the Forbidden City of China.
 February 4 – The Longqing Emperor ascends the throne of the Ming Dynasty.
 February 10 – Henry Stuart, Lord Darnley, husband of Mary, Queen of Scots, is murdered at the Provost's House in Kirk o' Field, Edinburgh.
 March 13 – Battle of Oosterweel: A Spanish mercenary army surprises and kills a band of rebels near Antwerp in the Habsburg Netherlands, beginning the Eighty Years' War.
 May 15 – Mary, Queen of Scots, marries James Hepburn, 4th Earl of Bothwell.
 May 24 – Sture Murders: The mentally unstable King Erik XIV of Sweden and his guards murder five incarcerated nobles at Uppsala Castle.
 June 15 – Battle of Carberry Hill: Mary, Queen of Scots, is defeated by the Scottish nobles and imprisoned in Loch Leven Castle.

July–December 
 July 24 – Mary, Queen of Scots, is forced to abdicate, and replaced by her one-year-old son James VI.
 July 25 – The city of Santiago de León de Caracas is founded by Diego de Losada.
 July 29 – James VI is crowned at Stirling.
 August 22 – The Duke of Alba is sent to the Netherlands with a strong Spanish force, to suppress unrest there. He replaces Margaret of Parma as Governor of the Netherlands. Prince William of Orange is outlawed, and Lamoral, Count of Egmont imprisoned.
 September 9 – At a dinner, the Duke of Alba arrests Lamoral, Count of Egmont and Philip de Montmorency, Count of Horn for treason.
 September 27 – After the 2-week Siege of Inabayama Castle, the Oda clan capture Gifu Castle from the Saitō clan in Japan.
 September 29 – The Second War of Religion begins in France, when Louis, Prince of Condé and Gaspard de Coligny fail in an attempt to capture King Charles IX and his mother at Meaux. The Huguenots do capture several cities (including Orléans), and march on Paris.
 October 7 – Bible translations into Welsh: The New Testament is first published in Welsh, in William Salesbury's translation from the Greek.
 November 10 – Battle of Saint-Denis: Anne de Montmorency, with 16,000 Royalists, falls on Condé's 3,500 Huguenots. The Huguenots surprisingly hold on for some hours before being driven off. Montmorency is mortally wounded.

Date unknown 
 King Frederick II of Denmark and Norway founds Fredrikstad in Norway.
 Construction of Villa Capra "La Rotonda" in Vicenza, designed by Andrea Palladio, begins. It will be one of the most influential designs in the history of architecture.
 Rugby School, one of the oldest public schools in England, is founded.
 Although sparse maritime trade existed since its founding, the Ming dynasty government of China officially revokes the haijin maritime trade ban, reinstating foreign trade with all countries except Japan.

Births 

 January 1 – Fabio Colonna, Italian scientist (d. 1640)
 January 4 – François d'Aguilon, Belgian Jesuit mathematician (d. 1617)
 January 12 – Jan Szczęsny Herburt, Polish political writer (d. 1616)
 January 25 – Archduchess Margaret of Austria (d. 1633)
 January 27 – Anna Maria of Hesse-Kassel, Countess Consort of Nassau-Saarbrücke (d. 1626)
 February 3 – Anna Maria of Brandenburg, Duchess Consort of Pomerania (d. 1618)
 February 12 – Thomas Campion, English poet and composer (d. 1620)
 February 23 – Elisabeth of Brunswick-Wolfenbüttel, Countess of Holstein-Schauenburg and  Duchess Consort of Brunswick-Harburg (d. 1618)
 February 24 – Jindřich Matyáš Thurn, Swedish general (d. 1640)
 February 27 – William Alabaster, English poet (d. 1640)
 March 13 (bapt.) – Jacob van Heemskerk, Dutch admiral and explorer (d. 1607)
 March 17 – Akizuki Tanenaga, Japanese samurai and soldier (d. 1614)
 April 10 – John Louis I, Count of Nassau-Wiesbaden-Idstein, Germany noble (d. 1596)
 April 26 – Nicolas Formé, French composer (d. 1638)
 May 2 – Sebald de Weert, Dutch captain, vice-admiral of the Dutch East India Company (d. 1603)
 May 9 – John George I, Prince of Anhalt-Dessau (1603–1618) (d. 1618)
 May 13 – Don Giovanni de' Medici, Italian military commander and diplomat (d. 1621)
 May 15 – Claudio Monteverdi, Italian composer (d. 1643)
 June 25 – Jacob Ulfeldt, Danish politician (d. 1630)
 August 14 – Luigi Caponaro, Italian healer (d. 1622)
 August 15 – Philip III, Margrave of Baden-Rodemachern (1588–1620) (d. 1620)
 August 21 – Francis de Sales, Savoyard Bishop of Geneva and saint (d. 1622)
 September – Edward Sutton, 5th Baron Dudley, English landowner (d. 1643)
 September 2 – György Thurzó, Palatine of Hungary (d. 1616)
 September 5 – Date Masamune, Japanese daimyō (d. 1636)
 September 24 – Martin Fréminet, French painter (d. 1619)
 October 10 – Infanta Catherine Michelle of Spain (d. 1597)
 November 
 Thomas Nashe, English poet (d. 1600)
 Minye Kyawswa II of Ava, last crown prince of the Toungoo Empire (Burma) (d. 1599)
 November 1 – Diego Sarmiento de Acuña, 1st Count of Gondomar, Spanish diplomat (d. 1626)
 November 7 – Margherita Farnese, Benedictine nun (d. 1643)
 November 14 – Maurice of Nassau, Prince of Orange (d. 1625)
 November 16 – Anna of Saxony, German noblewoman (d. 1613)
 November 21 – Anne de Xainctonge, French religious (d. 1621)
 December 15 – Christoph Demantius, German composer (d. 1643)
 December 18
 Cornelius a Lapide, Jesuit exegete (d. 1637)
 Tachibana Muneshige, Japanese samurai and soldier (d. 1643)
 date unknown
 Valens Acidalius, German critic and poet (d. 1595)
 Isabel Barreto, Spanish admiral (d. 1612)
 Pierre Biard, French settler and Jesuit missionary (d. 1622)
 Adriaen Block, Dutch fur trader and navigator (d. 1624)
 Jacques Clément, French assassin of Henry III of France (d. 1589)
 Arima Harunobu, Japanese Christian daimyō (d. 1612)
 John Parkinson, English herbalist and botanist (d. 1650)
 Willem Schouten, Dutch navigator (d. 1625)
 Torii Tadamasa, Japanese nobleman (d. 1628)
 Sanada Yukimura, Japanese samurai and soldier (d. 1615)
 Ban Naoyuki, Japanese samurai and soldier (d. 1615)

Deaths 

 January 12 – Eva von Trott, German noble and courtier (b. 1505)
 January 17 – Sampiero Corso, Corsican mercenary leader (b. 1498)
 January 23 – Jiajing Emperor of China (b. 1507)
 January 26 – Nicholas Wotton, English diplomat (c. b. 1497) 
 February 10 – Henry Stuart, Lord Darnley, consort of Mary, Queen of Scots (b. 1545)
 February 20 – Estácio de Sá, Portuguese officer, founder of Rio de Janeiro (b. 1520)
 March 31 – Philip I, Landgrave of Hesse (b. 1504)
 April 1 – Jan Krzysztof Tarnowski, Polish nobleman (b. 1537)
 April 2 – Ernest III, Duke of Brunswick-Grubenhagen (b. 1518)
 April 18 – Wilhelm von Grumbach, German adventurer (b. 1503)
 April 19 – Michael Stifel, German mathematician (b. 1487)
 May 2 – Marin Držić, Croatian writer (b. 1508)
 June 2 – Shane O'Neill, Irish chieftain (b. 1530)
 June 12 – Richard Rich, Lord Chancellor of England (b. 1490)
 June 19 – Anna of Brandenburg, Duchess of Mecklenburg-Güstrow (b. 1507)
 August 3 – Myeongjong of Joseon, ruler of Korea (b. 1534)
 August 18 – Enea Vico, Italian engraver (b. 1523)
 October 1 – Pietro Carnesecchi, Italian humanist (b. 1508)
 October 31 – Marie of Brandenburg-Kulmbach, Princess of Brandenburg-Kulmbach and by marriage Electress Palatine (b. 1519)
 November 12 – Anne de Montmorency, Constable of France (b. 1493)
 November 13 – Pedro de la Gasca, viceroy of Peru (b. 1485)
 November 19 – Takeda Yoshinobu, Japanese daimyō (b. 1538)
 date unknown
 Thomas Beccon, English Protestant reformer (b. 1511)
 Péter Erdődy, ban of Croatia (b. 1504)
 Shahghali, khan of Qasim (b. 1505)
 Lawrence Sheriff, English gentleman and grocer to Elizabeth I (b. 1510)
 Akagawa Motoyasu, Japanese samurai

References